Gennaro Borrelli (born 10 March 2000) is an Italian footballer who plays as a forward for  club Frosinone on loan from Pescara.

Club career

Pescara
He was raised in Pescara's youth teams and made his first appearance for their Under-19 squad in the 2016–17 season. Late in the 2018–19 season, he received 3 call-ups to the senior squad, but remained on the bench.

He made his professional Serie B debut for Pescara on 27 September 2019 in a game against Crotone. He substituted Andrea Cisco in the 78th minute.

On 5 October 2020 he joined Cosenza on loan.

On 20 January 2021 he moved on a new loan to Serie C club Juve Stabia.

On 11 August 2021, he joined Monopoli on loan.

On 29 July 2022, Borrelli joined Frosinone on loan with a conditional redemption obligation.

References

External links
 

2000 births
Living people
People from Campobasso
Sportspeople from the Province of Campobasso
Italian footballers
Association football forwards
Serie B players
Serie C players
Delfino Pescara 1936 players
Cosenza Calcio players
S.S. Juve Stabia players
S.S. Monopoli 1966 players
Frosinone Calcio players
Footballers from Molise